The MTV Immies are held every year with an aim to award the best talents in the Indian music industry. In 2005 The Immies supported relief for the quake victims of India and Pakistan. Also, proceeds from donor passes were given to the Prime Minister's Relief Fund. In keeping with tradition, a number of Pakistani as well as international artists performed at the event.

Award winners

2003

FILM CATEGORY WINNERS 

Best Performance in a song - Male: Shahrukh Khan - Chalte Chalte
Best Performance in a song - Female: Yana Gupta - Dum
Best Composer: A. R. Rahman - Saathiya
Best Lyrics: Gulzar - Saathiya
Best Singer - Male: Sonu Nigam - Saathiya
Best Singer - Female: Chitra - Koi... Mil Gaya
Best Album: Kal Ho Naa Ho - Karan Johar / Yash Johar
Best Choreography: Farah Khan - Koi... Mil Gaya
Best New Film Music Talent - Male / Female: Sonu Kakkar - Dum

POP CATEGORY

Best Male Pop Act - Solo / Duo / Group: Adnan Sami - Tera Chehra
Best Female Pop Act - Solo / Duo / Group: Falguni Pathak - Yeh Kya Jadoo Kiya
Best Pop Album: Tera Chehra
Best Video: Bela Segal - Tera Chehra
Best New Non-film Talent - Male / Female: Babul Supriyo - Soochta Hun
Best Remix Video / Song: Kaanta Laga - Harry Anand / Rao & Sapru Films

INTERNATIONAL CATEGORY

Best Male Pop Act - Solo / Duo / Group: Westlife
Best Female Pop Act - Solo / Duo / Group: Norah Jones
Best Debut: Norah Jones

SPECIAL CATEGORY

Inspiration / Special Award: Lata Mangeshkar

JURY CATEGORY

Best Ghazal Album: Pankaj Udhas - Yaaron Mujhe
Best Devotional / Spiritual Album: Jagjit Singh - Hari Om Tat Sat
Best Classical / Classical Fusion Album - Vocal: Bhimsen Joshi - Tum Kaheko Neha Lagaye
Best Classical / Classical Fusion Album - Instrumental: Rahul Sharma - Psychadelia
Best Detection IMI Team for the Year 2003: Ram Kripal Singh - DSP (Retd) and Bindeshwari Singh - Sr. Inspector (Retd)

2004

FILM CATEGORY: 

Best New Film Music Talent: Kunal Ganjawala (Bheege Honth)
Best Lyrics: Arun Bhairav (Lal Dupatta)
Best Singer Male (Film): Sonu Nigam (Main Hoon Na)
Best Singer Female (Film): Sunidhi Chauhan (Dekh Le)
Best Performance in a Song Male (Film): Hrithik Roshan (Main Aisa Kyon Hoon)
Best Performance in a Song Female (Film): Sushmita Sen (Tumhe Joh Maine Dekha)
Best Film Album: Main Hoon Na
Best Choreographer: Prabhudeva (Main Aisa Kyoh Hoon)
Best Composer: Pritam (Dhoom Machale)

POP CATEGORY:
 
Best Female Pop: Sneha Pant (Kabhi Aar Kabhi Paar)
Best Male Pop Singer: Bombay Vikings (Chhod Do Aanchal)
Best Pop Album: Harry Anand (Sweet Honey Mix)
Best Music Video: Raj Santhkumar & Shruti Vohra (Chhod Do Aanchal)
Best International Pop Debut: The Black Eyed Peas
Best Remix Video Song: DJ Suketu (Bin Tere Sanam)
Best New Non Film Talent: Josh (Kabhi)
Best Ghazal Album: Jagjit Singh (Close To My Heart)
Best Female International: Tata Young
Best Male Pop Act International: Enrique Iglesias

JURY AWARDS:
 
Best Classical Fusion Instrumental: Niladri Kumar
Best Classical Vocal: Parveen Sultana
Staying Alive Award: Shailendra Singh of Percept D'Mark
Inspiration Award: Naushad
Best Devotional / Spiritual Album: Pandit Jasraj

2005

FILM CATEGORY WINNERS 

Best Performance In A Song - Male: Abhishek Bachchan & Zayed Khan - Dus Bahane
Best Performance In A Song - Female: Aishwarya Rai - Kajra Re
Best Male Singer: Kunal Ganjawala - Salaam Namaste
Best Female Singer: Alisha Chinai - Kajra Re
Best Film Album: Bunty Aur Babli - Yash Raj Films Pvt. Ltd
Best Composer: Himesh Reshammiya - Aashiq Banaya Aapne
Best Lyricist: Sayeed Quadri - Woh Lamhe
Best Choreographer: Farah Khan - Just Chill
Best New Film Music Talent: Himesh Reshammiya - Aashiq Banaya Aapne

INDIPOP CATEGORY WINNERS 

Best Male Pop Act: Abhijeet Sawant - Mohabbatein Lutaunga
Best Female Pop Act: Asha Bhosle - Aaj Jaane Ki Zid Na Karo
Best Pop Album: Sonu Nigam - Chanda Ki Doli
Best Remix Video Song: Dj Suketu/Ahmed Khan - Kya Khoob Lagti Ho
Best New Non Film Talent: Abhijeet Sawant - Mohabbatein Lutaunga
Best Video: Anand Surapur (Rabbi - Bulla Ki Jaana)
Best Ghazal Album: Jagjit Singh’s - Raat Khamosh Hai
Best Classical Instrumental Album: Amjad Ali Khan & Bismillah Khan
Best Devotional Album: Pundit Jasraj
Best Classical Vocal Album: Kishori Amonkar
Best Fusion Album: Medieval Pundits

INTERNATIONAL CATEGORY: 

Best International Debut: Gwen Stefani
Best International Male Pop Act: U2
Best International Female Pop Act: Mariah Carey

INSPIRATION AWARD: 
Yash Raj Chopra

2006
Best Performance In A Song - Female: Kovai Sarala - Beedi

See also
 MTV India
 MTV Asia
 MTV Networks Asia
 MTV Award Shows

External links
 Official Immies Site
 Official MTV India Website

Indian music awards